William Frederick "Bones" Ely (June 7, 1863 – January 10, 1952) was a shortstop in Major League Baseball. He was born in North Girard, Pennsylvania.

Ely was the starting shortstop for the Pittsburgh Pirates for several seasons before Honus Wagner. Immediately before his release during the 1901 season, an article in The Buffalo Enquirer described the only thing standing between Wagner and Pittsburgh's shortstop job was "Bones Ely, who has gone back faster than an incline car that has slipped a cable. Ely cannot hit a balloon and his fielding is passe."

During the 1904 season, Bones Ely along with his brother Ben Ely purchased the Portland Browns of the Pacific Coast League. Bones Ely managed 33 games that season before resigning his position on May 16. The Ely brothers sold their shares of the team to Walter McCredie and William Wallace McCredie before the end of the season.

Ely died at the age of 88 in Imola, California.  His remains were cremated and placed in the Chapel of the Chimes columbarium in Oakland.

Sources

External links
, or Retrosheet, or SABR Biography Project

1863 births
1952 deaths
19th-century baseball players
Atlanta Windjammers players
Baseball players from Pennsylvania
Binghamton Bingoes players
Binghamton Crickets (1880s) players
Brooklyn Grooms players
Buffalo Bisons (NL) players
Duluth Whalebacks players
Louisville Colonels players
Major League Baseball shortstops
Memphis Giants players
Minor league baseball executives
People from Erie County, Pennsylvania
Philadelphia Athletics players
Pittsburgh Pirates players
Portland Beavers managers
St. Louis Browns (NL) players
St. Paul Apostles players
Syracuse Stars (AA) players
Syracuse Stars (minor league baseball) players
Toledo Black Pirates players
Washington Senators (1901–1960) players
Youngstown (minor league baseball) players
San Francisco Pirates players